Eoloxozus is a genus of flies in the family Neriidae.

Species
Eoloxozus sabroskyi Aczél, 1961

References

Brachycera genera
Neriidae
Diptera of South America
Endemic fauna of Peru